Slabystraße is an interchange station on the Cologne Stadtbahn lines 13 and 18, located in the Cologne district of Nippes. The station lies within the western feeder to the Cologne Mülheim Bridge.

The station was opened in 1974 and consists of four side platforms with four rail tracks.

See also 
 List of Cologne KVB stations

External links 
 station info page 

Cologne KVB stations
Nippes, Cologne
Railway stations in Germany opened in 1974